Events from the year 1864 in the United Kingdom.

Incumbents
 Monarch – Victoria
 Prime Minister – Henry John Temple, 3rd Viscount Palmerston (Liberal)
 Parliament – 18th

Events
 11 January – Charing Cross railway station in London opens.
 11 March – Great Sheffield Flood: the Dale Dike Dam bursts devastating Sheffield.
 29 March – Treaty of London: Britain voluntarily cedes control of the United States of the Ionian Islands to the Kingdom of Greece with effect from 2 May.
 1 April – Barrow Hematite Iron and Steel Company registered to take over and expand the works at Barrow-in-Furness, which will become the world's largest steel mill.
 April – Giuseppe Garibaldi visits England.
 7 May – City of Adelaide is launched at Sunderland by William Pile, Hay and Co. for the Australia trade; by 2014 she will be the world's oldest surviving clipper.
 c. May–June – Ending of Second Anglo-Ashanti war.
 June – overarm bowling legalised in cricket.
 20 August – John Alexander Reina Newlands produces the first periodic table of the chemical elements.
 5–6 September – Bombardment of Shimonoseki: An American, British, Dutch and French alliance engages the powerful feudal Japanese warlord or daimyō Lord Mōri Takachika of the Chōshū clan based in Shimonoseki, Japan.
 28 September – International Workingmen's Association founded in London.
 10 October – Quebec Conference to discuss plans for the creation of a Dominion of Canada, begins.
 18 October – abolition of squadron colours in the Royal Navy, reserving the White Ensign to the Navy, the Red Ensign to the Merchant Navy and the Blue Ensign to military vessels.
 22 October – the predecessor of Wrexham A.F.C. plays its first match, making it the oldest association football club in Wales and the world's sixth oldest football club and third oldest professional team.
 2 November – HMS Victoria (1859), the Royal Navy's last, largest and fastest wooden first-rate three-decker ship of the line to see sea service, enters active service.
 10 November – first match played on the newly laid out Royal North Devon Golf Club course, the oldest surviving in England. 
 8 December
 The Clifton Suspension Bridge across the Bristol Avon, designed by Isambard Kingdom Brunel and completed as a memorial to him, opens to traffic.
 James Clerk Maxwell presents his paper A Dynamical Theory of the Electromagnetic Field to the Royal Society, concluding that light is an electromagnetic wave.
 Undated
 Joseph Hepworth sets up his tailoring business in Leeds, predecessor of Next plc.
 Oriel Chambers, Liverpool, the world's first metal-framed glass curtain walled building, designed by Peter Ellis (architect), is built.

Publications
 Harry Clifton's song "Pretty Polly Perkins of Paddington Green".
 Charles Dickens's novel Our Mutual Friend (serialisation begins).
 Amelia Edwards' novel Barbara's History.
 John Henry Newman's spiritual autobiography Apologia Pro Vita Sua.
 James Payn's novel Lost Sir Massingberd (in Chambers's Journal).
 Anthony Trollope's novel The Small House at Allington (publication concludes) and Can You Forgive Her? (publication commences).
 John Wisden publishes The Cricketer's Almanack for the year 1864 (February) which will go on to become the major annual cricket reference publication.

Births
 8 January – Prince Albert Victor, Duke of Clarence (died 1892)
 21 January – Israel Zangwill, novelist and playwright (died 1926)
 20 February – Henry Rawlinson, 1st Baron Rawlinson, general (died 1925)
 12 March – W. H. R. Rivers, psychiatrist (died 1922)
 6 April – William Bate Hardy, biologist and food scientist (died 1934)
 9 April – Sebastian Ziani de Ferranti, electrical engineer and inventor (died 1930 in Switzerland)
 22 April – Phil May, caricaturist (died 1903)
 4 May – Marie Booth, third daughter of William and Catherine Booth (died 1937)
 10 June – Ninian Comper, architect (died 1960)
 18 July – Philip Snowden politician, Chancellor of the Exchequer (died 1937)
 14 September – Robert Cecil, 1st Viscount Cecil of Chelwood, politician and diplomat, recipient of the Nobel Peace Prize (died 1958)
 31 October – Cosmo Lang, Archbishop of Canterbury (died 1945)
 26 November – Edward Higgins, 3rd General of The Salvation Army (died 1947)

Deaths
 29 January
 Lucy Aikin, writer (born 1781)
 Julia Maitland, writer on India and for children (born 1808)
 2 February – Adelaide Anne Procter, poet (born 1825)
 10 February – William Henry Hunt, watercolour painter (born 1790)
 14 February – William Dyce, painter (born 1806)
 11 March – Richard Roberts, mechanical engineer (born 1789)
 16 March – Robert Smith Surtees, novelist and sporting writer (born 1805)
 21 March – Luke Howard, meteorologist and manufacturing chemist (born 1772)
 5 April – Alaric Alexander Watts, poet and journalist (born 1797)
 16 April – George Webster, architect (born 1797)
 26 April – John Shuttleworth, industrialist and political campaigner (born 1786)
 5 May – Elizabeth Andrew Warren, Cornish botanist, marine algolologist (born 1786) 
 20 May – John Clare, Northamptonshire peasant poet (born 1793)
 17 June – William Cureton, Orientalist (born 1808)
 6 August – Catherine Sinclair, Scottish novelist and children's writer (born 1800)
 15 September – John Hanning Speke, explorer (born 1827)
 17 September – Walter Savage Landor, writer and poet (born 1775)
 1 October – Ignatius Spencer, priest (born 1799)
 25 November – David Roberts, painter (born 1796)
 4 December – John Fowler, agricultural engineer (born 1826)
 8 December – George Boole, mathematician and philosopher (born 1815)
 21 December – Joshua Fawcett, clergyman and writer (born 1809)
 23 December – James Bronterre O'Brien, Chartist leader, reformer and journalist (born 1804)
 24 December – Princess Caraboo, impostor (born 1791)

See also
 1864 in Scotland

References

 
Years of the 19th century in the United Kingdom